The 2003 UTEP Miners football team represented the University of Texas at El Paso in the 2003 NCAA Division I-A football season. The team's head coach was Gary Nord, who was fired after the season. The Miners played their home games at the Sun Bowl Stadium in El Paso, Texas. UTEP averaged 20,009 fans per game.

Schedule

References

UTEP
UTEP Miners football seasons
UTEP Miners football